= Pontiac 200 =

There have been several races in the history of NASCAR's Nationwide Series that have been titled Pontiac 200:

- For the race known as the Pontiac Winner's Circle 200 in 1985, held at Darlington Raceway, see BI-LO 200
- For the race known as the Pontiac 200 from 1990 to 1991, held at Darlington Raceway, see Royal Purple 200
- For the race known as the Pontiac 200 from 1990 to 1991, held at Richmond International Raceway, see Bubba Burger 250
- For the race known as the Tri-City Pontiac 200 from 1985 to 1988, held at Bristol Motor Speedway, see Food City 250
- For the race known as the Pontiac 300 in 1990 and Pontiac 200 from 1991 to 1992, held at Nazareth Speedway, see Goulds Pumps/ITT Industries 200
